Winston Lloyd Bogarde (born 22 October 1970) is a Dutch retired professional footballer, and was the assistant coach at Ajax. He was known for his physical strength, and played mostly as a central defender although he could occasionally play as full-back.

He had spells at Ajax, Barcelona and Chelsea. With the latter club he garnered worldwide attention when he received little playing time (no Premier League level appearances in his last three seasons combined), and nevertheless insisted to see out his lucrative contract.

Bogarde represented the Dutch national team in one World Cup and one European Championship, being an international for five years.

Club career

Early years and Ajax
Born in Rotterdam, Bogarde started his career at Schiedamse Voetbal Vereniging in the Eerste Divisie, as a winger, then switched to the Eredivisie in summer 1991, playing with hometown club Sparta (he previously had a short loan spell with neighbouring SBV Excelsior in the second division) and scoring a career-best 11 goals in the 1993–94 season as it qualified for the UEFA Intertoto Cup.

Bogarde signed for AFC Ajax in 1994. After a slow first year – he did not leave the bench in the final of the team's victorious campaign in the UEFA Champions League– he became a defensive stalwart.

Milan and Barcelona
A.C. Milan signed Bogarde from Ajax for 1997–98, but he only made three Serie A appearances throughout his short stay. In January 1998 he moved to compatriot Louis van Gaal's FC Barcelona, playing 19 matches in the second part of the campaign as Barcelona won La Liga and the Copa del Rey.

As the Dutch influence at Barcelona was reducing so was Bogarde's, who only managed one league contest in his first full season partly due to injuries, although he bounced back for a second respectable one (21 games, two goals).

Chelsea
Bogarde signed for Chelsea in 2000–01, after following the advice of compatriot Mario Melchiot to join him at the Premier League side. He was signed when Gianluca Vialli was manager, although the latter had no idea the transfer was happening, it arguably being conducted by director of football Colin Hutchinson – Emerson Thome, also a centre-back, was shipped off to Sunderland; only weeks after arriving, newly appointed coach Claudio Ranieri wanted the player to leave.

According to Bogarde, it would be next to impossible to find a team that would offer him a contract comparable to the one he had at Chelsea: he was astounded at the salary the club had agreed on, as his value depreciated severely due to lack of first-team action, and decided to stay and honour his contract to the letter and appear for training every day, despite being only rarely selected to play. In the end, he only appeared 11 times during his four-year tenure, reportedly earning £40,000 a week during this period.

After playing as a substitute against Ipswich Town on Boxing Day in 2000, Bogarde only played one more competitive match before his contract expired in July 2004. He also featured from the bench, against Gillingham for that season's League Cup on 6 November 2002.

During his spell at Stamford Bridge, the club attempted to sell Bogarde due to his large salary, and demoted him to the reserve and youth teams in an effort to pressure him to leave. In response to concurrent UK press criticism, he responded: 'Why should I throw fifteen million euro away when it is already mine? At the moment I signed it was in fact my money, my contract. Both sides agreed wholeheartedly (...) Few people will ever earn so many. I am one of the few fortunates who do. I may be one of the worst buys in the history of the Premiership, but I don't care.'

On 8 November 2005, 34-year-old Bogarde announced his retirement from professional football. He returned to Ajax in the summer of 2017, being named assistant manager at their reserves under former teammate Michael Reiziger.

International career

Courtesy of steady performances at Ajax, Bogarde was summoned to UEFA Euro 1996 by Netherlands manager Guus Hiddink, who also included him in the squad for the 1998 FIFA World Cup. A starter in the first competition, he only backed up Arthur Numan in the second.

Bogarde had the chance to feature in his first start at a World Cup match against Brazil in the semi-finals, after starter Numan was suspended in the previous encounter against Argentina, but he sustained a serious shin injury during training and was hospitalised, being replaced by Philip Cocu.

Personal life
Bogarde's nephews, Melayro and Lamare Bogarde, are both footballers and Dutch youth internationals. Lamare recently signed a professional contract with Aston Villa.

Honours
Ajax
Eredivisie: 1994–95, 1995–96
Dutch Supercup: 1995
UEFA Champions League: 1994–95
Intercontinental Cup: 1995
UEFA Super Cup: 1995

Barcelona
La Liga: 1997–98, 1998–99
Copa del Rey: 1997–98
UEFA Super Cup: 1997

References

External links

Beijen profile 
Stats at Voetbal International 

11V11 profile

1970 births
Living people
Dutch sportspeople of Surinamese descent
Footballers from Rotterdam
Dutch footballers
Association football defenders
Eredivisie players
Eerste Divisie players
SV SVV players
Excelsior Rotterdam players
Sparta Rotterdam players
AFC Ajax players
Serie A players
A.C. Milan players
La Liga players
FC Barcelona players
Premier League players
Chelsea F.C. players
Netherlands international footballers
UEFA Euro 1996 players
1998 FIFA World Cup players
Dutch expatriate footballers
Expatriate footballers in Italy
Expatriate footballers in Spain
Expatriate footballers in England
Dutch expatriate sportspeople in Italy
Dutch expatriate sportspeople in Spain
Dutch expatriate sportspeople in England
UEFA Champions League winning players